Patrick Joseph O'Hare (1929 – 21 September 2015) was an Irish Gaelic footballer who played for the Ballymacnab Round Towers club and at senior level for the Armagh county team. He remains the only Ballymacnab man to have played in an All-Ireland Senior Football Championship final, after coming on for captain Sean Quinn in the second half of the 1953 final.

References

1929 births
2015 deaths
Armagh inter-county Gaelic footballers